The  (Church of the Holy Apostles of Christ), commonly called , is a 7th-century Roman Catholic church located in the Cannaregio  of the Italian city of Venice. It is one of the oldest churches in the city and has undergone numerous changes since its foundation. The present building is the result of a major reconstruction project which was undertaken in 1575. The church is notable particularly for the Cornaro Chapel, an important example of Early Renaissance architecture, added by Mauro Codussi during the 1490s. The chapel is the burial place of several members of the powerful Cornaro family, including Catherine Cornaro, Queen of Cyprus and Armenia. The church houses several works of art including pieces by Giambattista Tiepolo and Paolo Veronese.

History
In the 7th century Venice was not yet a city, but a collection of small communities scattered throughout the lagoon. St Magnus, the Bishop of Oderzo, came to the lagoon and founded eight churches. According to a legend recounted by the historian Flaminio Cornaro, St Magnus had a vision of the Twelve Apostles who commanded him to build a church on a site where he saw twelve cranes.

It is considered one of the most important Early Renaissance chapels in Venice. It is unknown exactly who designed the chapel, although it is most often attributed to the architect Mauro Codussi. At the same time a porch was added to the front of the church and a sacristy was built. These alterations were also overseen by Codussi.

In the middle of the 16th century the church briefly housed the Catecumeni, a Venetian fraternity for those wishing to convert to Christianity, before they established a permanent home at San Gregorio in 1571. Shortly after this, in 1575, the church was completely rebuilt. Only parts of the earlier structure were retained, including some frescos and the Cornaro Chapel.

During the early 18th century, Andrea Tirali added detailing, including the onion dome, to the campanile which itself had been a late 17th-century addition.

Interior
The church retains its 16th century layout: a single nave supported by two rows of columns. One chapel has the funeral monument of Count Giuseppe Mangilli, designed by Luigi Trezza with bust by Angelo Pizzi. The main altarpiece is a Custodian Angel by Bernardo Strozzi.

Cornaro Chapel
The chapel is the burial place of several members of the Cornaro family, including Giorgio Cornaro and his sister Catherine Cornaro  the Queen of Cyprus (since removed to the church of San Salvadore elsewhere in Venice), The charitable organisation Save Venice funded the restoration of the chapel, including the relief carvings. The main altar of this chapel was the Last Communion of St Lucy (1747–48) by Tiepolo.

Art
The church contains a number of paintings, including:
Paolo Veronese, Gathering of Manna, 1580–85.
Giovanni Contarini, Birth of the Virgin, 1599
Cesare da Conegliano, Last Supper, 1583
Fabio Canal, Communion of the Apostles and Exaltation of the Eucharist, 17th century
Sebastiano Santi, Christ between the Apostles, 1828

 Ceiling paintings by Fabio Canale

Notes

Citations

References

Italian

Roman Catholic churches in Venice
Renaissance architecture in Venice
15th-century Roman Catholic church buildings in Italy